Route 182 is a rural state highway in northwestern Connecticut, running from Norfolk to Colebrook.

Route description
Route 182 begins at an intersection with US 44 in the town center of Norfolk and heads east towards the town of Colebrook. It crosses into Colebrook  later, continuing east another  to end at an intersection with Route 183 south of Colebrook center. Route 182A is a short loop route that goes through the town center. Route 182 is known as Colebrook Road in Norfolk, and as Stillman Hill Road in Colebrook.

History
In the 1920s, The Norfolk-Colebrook route was designated as a secondary state highway known as Highway 327. In 1932, old Highway 327 was renumbered to Route 182, which originally ran along the current route of Route 182A near Colebrook center. In 1940, the route was rerouted to the current location and the former alignment redesignated Route 182A.

Junction list

Route 182A

Route 182A is a  alternate route of Route 182 within Colebrook, including a  unsigned section. Route 182A begins at an intersection with Route 182 in Colebrook and heads east on Rockwell Road to an intersection with Route 183. It then overlaps with Route 183 for the unsigned portion of the route, heading south-southwest to end at another intersection with Route 182. Route 182A was commissioned in approximately 1941. There have been no major changes since.

References

External links

182
Transportation in Litchfield County, Connecticut